The men's 4 × 10 kilometre relay at the 1999 Asian Winter Games was held on February 2, 1999 at Yongpyong Cross Country Venue, South Korea.

Schedule
All times are Korea Standard Time (UTC+09:00)

Results

References

Start list

External links
Results FIS

Men Relay